The Sudan competed at the 2004 Summer Paralympics in Athens. It was the country's first appearance at the Games since 1980. The Sudan was represented by two athletes, both competing in the discus event; neither of them won a medal.

Sports

Athletics

Men's field

Women's field

See also
Sudan at the Paralympics
Sudan at the 2004 Summer Olympics

External links
International Paralympic Committee

References 

Nations at the 2004 Summer Paralympics
2004
Summer Paralympics